Molholm Island is an island at the entrance to McGrady Cove in the eastern part of Newcomb Bay, in the Windmill Islands of Antarctica. The island was mapped from air photographs taken by U.S. Navy Operation Highjump in 1946–47, and was named by Carl R. Eklund for John Molholm, a glaciologist at Wilkes Station in 1957.

See also 
 List of antarctic and sub-antarctic islands
 Molholm Shoal, 0.1 nautical miles (0.2 km) west of Molholm Island

References

External links

Windmill Islands